Pervomaysky is a closed urban locality (an urban-type settlement) in Kirov Oblast, Russia. Population: 6,147(2010 Census); 9,300 (2002 Census).

Administrative and municipal status
Within the framework of administrative divisions, it is incorporated as the closed administrative-territorial formation of Pervomaysky—an administrative unit with the status equal to that of the districts. As a municipal division, the closed administrative-territorial formation of Pervomaysky is incorporated as Pervomaysky Urban Okrug.

References

Notes

Sources

Urban-type settlements in Kirov Oblast

